Gagarka (Kak-Arka) is a rural locality (a settlement) in Verkh-Uymonsskoye Rural Settlement of Ust-Koksinsky District, the Altai Republic, Russia. The population was 223 as of 2016. There are 6 streets. The town was founded in 1866.

Geography 
Gagarka is located on the right bank of the Katun River, 15 km southeast of Ust-Koksa (the district's administrative centre) by road. Verkh-Uymon is the nearest rural locality.

References 

Rural localities in Ust-Koksinsky District